The 1963–64 Borussia Dortmund season was the first season in the Bundesliga for Borussia Dortmund. After winning the 1963 German football championship, they could not defend their title and ended up 4th in the inaugural Bundesliga season. In the European Cup they closely missed the final after losing the semi-final against Internazionale.

Transfers

In

Out

Results

Bundesliga 

Note: Results are given with Borussia Dortmund score listed first.

European Cup 

Note: Results are given with Borussia Dortmund score listed first.

DFB-Pokal 

Note: Results are given with Borussia Dortmund score listed first.

See also 
 1963–64 Bundesliga
 1963–64 European Cup
 1963–64 DFB-Pokal

Borussia Dortmund seasons
Borusia Dortmund